Julia Ducournau (born 18 November 1983) is a French film director and screenwriter. She made her feature film debut in 2016 with Raw. At the 2021 Cannes Film Festival, she won the Palme d'Or for her film Titane, which made her the second female director to win the award as well as the first to win the award solo. Additionally, Ducournau also received a nomination for Best Director at the 75th British Academy Film Awards. Her films typically fall under the body horror genre.

Early life and career 
Julia Ducournau was born in Paris to a gynaecologist mother and dermatologist father. She attended La Fémis and studied screenwriting. Her first film, Junior, is a short film about a girl who “after contracting a stomach bug” began to “shed her skin” like a snake. In 2011, Junior won the Petit Rail d'Or at the 2011 Cannes Film Festival. In 2012, Ducournau released a TV-film titled Mange. The film follows a recovering bulimic who is seeking “revenge on her college tormentor.” Her first feature film is 2016's Raw. The project had been developed through the TorinoFilmLab Framework programme in 2013. Raw was screened in the International Critics' Week section at the 2016 Cannes Film Festival. In October 2016, Raw won the Sutherland Award for Best First Feature at the London Film Festival. Per David Fear of Rolling Stone, Raw is a contender for the "best horror movie of the decade." 

In 2021, Ducournau's sophomore feature Titane was bought by Neon. For Titane, Ducournau was awarded the coveted Palme d'Or at the 2021 Cannes Film Festival where it had its world premiere. The award was accidentally presented to Ducournau at the beginning of the awards ceremony by jury president Spike Lee, although it was intended to be the final award of the evening. Ducournau is the second female filmmaker to win after Jane Campion in 1993 for The Piano, the first to win not jointly with another director (Campion had won jointly alongside Chen Kaige, for Farewell My Concubine), and the fourth female overall to win after Adèle Exarchopoulos and Léa Seydoux won in 2013 for their performances in Blue is the Warmest Colour. Additionally, Ducournau also received a nomination for Best Director at the 75th British Academy Film Awards.

Theme and style 
Xavier Aldana Reyes categorizes Ducournau's films as "Gothic Horror Heroinism." This is illustrated by "graphic body horror" shown in all of her films. According to Ducournau, her "flesh fascination stems from her childhood" since both her parents are doctors. Per Ducournau, the way in which her parents spoke about the human body growing up informed her artistic expression within her films. For instance, she outlines in an interview with The Guardian that "doctors have this very upfront yet distant way of talking about bodies and death." Alex Godfrey, Guardian journalist, illustrates this "flesh fascination" can be seen through her "unflinching" use of the camera in Raw, with "unforgiving" closeups and "atrocities un-glorified."

Ducournau's work has become known for being brutal and disturbing. In a screening of her film Raw at the 2016 Toronto International Film Festival, two audience members reportedly fainted and were taken to the hospital. Though her film generated a surprising response from these viewers, Ducournau remains assured in her representations of humanity through her filmmaking. The Independent'''s Jack Shepherd writes: "the director would rightly much rather the discussion around Raw centre on the question of what it means to be human". In their interview, Ducournau herself states: “You have to accept some parts of us that are hard to watch, hard to acknowledge because it’s in us, because it’s scary." Ducournau considers the title character of David Lynch's The Elephant Man as "the essence of humanity," which she takes inspiration from in her filmography. In an interview with Vulture's Rachel Handler, Ducournau discusses her thematic interest in relating monstrosity to coming-of-age, suggesting that "the element of monstrosity in teenage years is incredibly enduring and real." She takes inspiration from artists whose work centers around monstrosity: filmmakers like David Lynch and David Cronenberg, and authors like Mary Shelley and Edgar Allan Poe.

Ducournau is also very passionate about separating her gender from her craft and from her recognition in the film industry. In a conversation with Indiewire's Eric Kohn, she states, "When people say I’m a woman director—I mean, that’s always a bit annoying, because I’m a person." On her historic Palme d'Or win at Cannes, Ducournau told ABC News' Jake Coyle: "Maybe we [are] entering an era where things would be more equal in acknowledging of the work of people beyond their gender."

 Filmography 

 Other work 
 The Wakhan Front (2015) (script consultant)
 A Taste of Ink'' (2016) (script consultant)

References

External links
 

1983 births
Living people
21st-century French screenwriters
Directors of Palme d'Or winners
Film directors from Paris
French women film directors
French women screenwriters
Writers from Paris